Gareth Parrington is a television actor.

In the television drama Soldier Soldier, Parrington played James Anderson, the eight-year-old son of Colour Sergeant Ian Anderson (Robert Glenister).  On the ITV children's sitcom Harry's Mad (1993–1996), Parrington starred as Harry Holdsworth in series one, two, and four.

A graduate of the University of Birmingham, after acting, Parrington worked as an English teacher in Japan, snowboarding instructor, and resort manager.

References

External links
 

Alumni of the University of Birmingham
British male snowboarders
British male television actors
Living people
Teachers of English as a second or foreign language
Year of birth missing (living people)